Jaisurya is a 2004 Tamil action film directed by Manoj Kumar. The film stars Arjun in dual roles, along with Laila, Chaya Singh and Vadivelu in pivotal roles. The movie was scored by Deva. The film received negative reviews from critics.

Plot
Surya (Arjun), assisted by Baby (Laila), is a conman whose services can be bought by anyone for the right price. His tricks result in the dismissal of both the Assistant Commissioner (Ilavarasu) and his brother, the Police Minister (Raj Kapoor). So they seek the help of Pasupathy (Shobaraj), another dada in Madras. When Pasupathy is recruited by a goon from Calcutta to kidnap the Kancheepuram collector, Surya decides to foil his plan and save the collector. When saving the man, he finds that the collector Jai Anand (Arjun) is a spitting image of himself. Jai's fiancée Priya (Chaya Singh) tells Surya about Jai's past as the collector in Calcutta.

Cast

 Arjun in dual role as Jai Anand IAS / Surya
 Laila as Baby
 Chaya Singh as Charupriya
 Vadivelu as Soosai
 Kota Srinivasa Rao as Highways Govindan
 Shobaraj as Pasupathy
 Ilavarasu as ACP
 Raj Kapoor as Police Minister
 Mahanadi Shankar
 Paravai Muniyamma
 Uday Prakash
 T. P. Gajendran
 Bonda Mani
 Ravi Kumar
 Durai Pandian

Production
During the launch event of the film in February 2004, producers had put up promotional stills of actress Sneha before she had signed the film. Subsequently, the team moved quickly to sign on Laila and make up for their error.

Soundtrack

Music was composed by Deva and released on Five Star Audio.

Release
Due to producer's financial crunch, Jaisuryas release was delayed for 4 months.

Critical reception
Biz Hat wrote "There is nothing spectacular about music and cinematography either.Manoj Kumar had produced and directed the film. On what basis did he choose such a story?". 
Thiraipadam wrote "Movies with dual roles usually pick up the pace and become more interesting after the two characters meet. But the reverse happens in Jai Soorya. Things get ridiculous and the movie skids to a complete stop after the collector's flashback." 
Chennai Online wrote "The problem with the film is that the director doesn't seem to have quite made up his mind whether his narrative style should be a light-hearted one or serious. So it meanders somewhere between the two and ends in a confused amalgam of emotions, with neither the humour nor the intensity really touching one!".

References

Indian action films
2000s masala films
2004 films
2000s Tamil-language films
Films scored by Deva (composer)
Films set in Kolkata
Films shot in Kolkata
2004 action films
Films directed by Manoj Kumar